Daniel Joseph Pybus (born 12 December 1997) is an English professional footballer who plays as a midfielder for York City. Pybus has previously played for Bradford City, Blyth Spartans, Tønsberg in Norway, Queen of the South and Dunfermline Athletic.

Career
In March 2017, after playing youth football for Sunderland and Derby County, Pybus signed for Bradford City and debuted on 30 April 2017, as a substitute in the final league match of the 2016–17 season. In May 2017, Pybus signed a one-year extension to his contract with the Bantams. In February 2018, Pybus was sent out on loan to Bradford Park Avenue and departed the Bantams by mutual consent in April 2018.

On 8 September 2018, Pybus signed for National League North club Blyth Spartans and only stayed at the club for four days and signed for the Norwegian club Tønsberg later that week.

In July 2019, Pybus signed a one-year contract with Scottish Championship club Queen of the South. On 21 December 2019, Pybus scored his first senior career goal in the 33rd minute versus Arbroath at Palmerston Park in a 2–0 win in the Scottish Championship. After initially being released by the Doonhamers in the wake of the COVID-19 pandemic in Scotland, on 24 August 2020, Pybus signed once again for the Palmerston Park club on a one-year deal until 31 May 2021. 

After departing from the Dumfries club at the end of his contract, Pybus signed for fellow Scottish Championship side Dunfermline Athletic on a one-year deal. Following the team's relegation in the play-offs, his contract was not extended and he left the club at the end of the season.

On 2 August 2022, Pybus signed for newly promoted National League club York City.

Career statistics

References

1997 births
Living people
English footballers
Association football midfielders
Sunderland A.F.C. players
Derby County F.C. players
Bradford City A.F.C. players
Bradford (Park Avenue) A.F.C. players
Blyth Spartans A.F.C. players
FK Tønsberg players
Queen of the South F.C. players
Dunfermline Athletic F.C. players
York City F.C. players
English Football League players
National League (English football) players
English expatriate footballers
Expatriate footballers in Norway
English expatriate sportspeople in Norway